Rhoptropus benguellensis, the Benguela day gecko, is a species of lizard in the family Gekkonidae. The species is endemic to Angola.

References

benguellensis
Geckos of Africa
Reptiles of Angola
Endemic fauna of Angola
Reptiles described in 1938
Taxa named by Robert Mertens